Christian Joseph Raab (born ), better known by his stage name Raab Himself, is an American television personality known as a former member of the CKY crew featured in the MTV series Viva La Bam and Jackass.

Biography

Raab was born in Willow Grove, Pennsylvania. The nickname "Raab Himself" was bestowed upon him by fellow CKY crew member Chris Aspite.

Raab battled drug addiction and alcoholism, and was able to find sobriety later in life. He has since focused on other film projects, such as Hotdog Casserole and Borrowed Happiness. Raab also appeared on Loudwire's Wikipedia: Fact or Fiction? In 2018, he launched his own podcast, titled Bathroom Break Podcast. Raab also launched his own video production company named Green Gate Entertainment.

Filmography

Films

Television

Web series

Music videos

References

External links 

 
Chris Raab on Twitter
Bathroom Break Podcast on YouTube
Chris Raab on Instagram
 https://web.archive.org/web/20170116172238/http://borrowedhappiness.bigcartel.com/

American television personalities
CKY
Jackass (TV series)
American stunt performers
People from Montgomery County, Pennsylvania
Shippensburg University of Pennsylvania alumni
Living people
Year of birth missing (living people)